The Baroque are an Italian progressive rock and glam rock band.

History
Baroque was formed in Turin in 2003. They grew up in the city's underground music scene, and they won the third edition of the Torino Sotterranea.

During their years of activity, they have achieved national recognition, winning the eco-competition "Talenti Per Natura" organized by LifeGate Radio.

The group released their debut album La fiaba della buonanotte under the French label Musea Records. Three music videos were taken from it, two of which were aired on All Music. In October 2010, they released the EP R.I.P. (Rock In Peace). A second album, ROCQ, was released in January 2011 with Hertz Brigade Records and later edited by Musea Records.

Members
The original line-up included Matteo A. Tambussi (vocals, chorus, guitar), Alberto Ghigo (vocals, chorus, bass), Stefano Tiozzo (piano, synth, chorus, electric guitar), and Alessandro Galletto (drums). Since 2012, Simone Rubinato has been part of the band taking over bass and chorus.

Musical style and influences
The band's style is a rock tinted with various influences, ranging from progressive rock, hard rock, glam, classical and blues.

Discography
Their discography includes two albums and one EP: La fiaba della buonanotte (2007), ROCQ (2011), and R.I.P. (Rock in Peace) (2010).

References

External links
 
 
 

Italian progressive rock groups